The Tiburones de La Guaira are a baseball team in the Venezuelan Professional Baseball League. Based in the city of La Guaira, they play their home games in Estadio Fórum La Guaira and have won seven national championships since their founding in 1962.

History
In 1962 the Licoreros de Pampero team, which was founded in 1955, was sold for the symbolic price of one Bolívar by his owner Alejandro Hernández to José Antonio Casanova, who was considered the greatest Venezuelan manager at the time. The new team changed its name to Tiburones de la Guaira.

Casanova, who was also the first manager of the team, did not have enough financial resources to go through an entire season. He then talked to his friend, Dr. Jesús Morales Valarino, who suggested an alliance with an important group of personalities and traders such as Manuel Malpica, Jose Antonio Diaz, Mario Gomez y Pablo Diaz. In that moment Tiburones de la Guaira was born, taking the field for first time ever in the 1962–1963 season. It was Morales' idea to take the team to the city of La Guaira, in order to take advantage of a city with no team yet numerous baseball fans.

In their first season, the Tiburones finished with a 23–19 record, missing the finals disputed between the Leones del Caracas and Industriales de Valencia. The team struggled in 1963–1964, ending third with a 23–27 record, being locked out of contention. La Guaira club would have to wait until its third season to win the first league championship, in a five-game confrontation against the Leones.

La Guaira was managed by Casanova until that year, and had remarkable players such as MLB Hall of Famers Luis Aparicio and Rollie Fingers, and Ángel Bravo, José Herrera and Elio Chacón as top Venezuelan figures. Casanova's contract expired in 1965 and the board of directors decided to finish the work relationship buying all his stock. Then Pedro Padrón Panza, who was among the original founders, bought all the stock to become the single owner.

At the time, Padrón worked hard to settle an important base of players which was later known as "La Guerrilla", because –no matter the score of a game– they were a never-surrender bunch of players who gave all to the cause. Some notable names includes the likes of Ozzie Guillén, Carlos Martinez, Gustavo Polidor, Luis Salazar and Luis Mercedes Sánchez, among others.

Padrón suffered a long illness starting in the early 1990s, which affected the level of his beloved team as well. He died in 1999, aged 78, leaving the control of the franchise to his son, Pedro Padrón Briñez, also known as "Peruchito". Nevertheless, Padrón Jr. and his son died in the 1999 Vargas tragedy that killed tens of thousands of people.

Marked by the death of three generations –past, present and future– of the team, the Tiburones tried to repeat their glorious performances of the 1970s and 1980s in the 2000–2001 season under manager and former player Luis Salazar, almost clinching a playoff spot. Since then, the Tiburones has become a competitive force again in the Venezuela league, missing the final series by taking a loss in an extra game in the 2008–2009 season against the Tigres de Aragua, and reaching the final series in 2011–2012, which they end up losing again to Aragua in six games.

Championship titles/Managers
1964–1965: José Antonio Casanova
1965–1966: Tony Pacheco
1968–1969: Wilfredo Calviño
1970–1971: Graciano Ravelo
1982–1983: Oswaldo Virgil
1984–1985: Aurelio Monteagudo
1985–1986: José Martínez

Caribbean Series records

Team highlights
1964–1965 : Darold Knowles won the pitching Triple Crown
2013–2014 : Alex Cabrera became the first batting Triple Crown winner in VPBL history

VPBL regular season leaders

Hitting
Batting average

Home runs

Runs batted in

Pitching
Wins

   * Tied with Lew Krausse Jr. (Caracas)
  ** Tied with Jim McGlothlin (Valencia)
 *** Tied with Diego Seguí (Caracas)

Earned run average

Strikeouts

Current roster

Major League alumni
 
 Ehíré Adríanza
 Ronald Belisario
 Edwin Bellorín
 Gregor Blanco
 Ángel Bravo
 Alex Cabrera
 Elio Chacón
 Sergio Escalona
 Eduardo Escobar
 Enrique González
 Luis González
 Wiki González
 Ozzie Guillén
 Remigio Hermoso
 Carlos Hernández
 Enzo Hernández
 Luis Hernández
 José Herrera
 Odubel Herrera
 Felipe Lira
 Carlos Martínez
 José Martínez
 Yoervis Medina
 Ray Olmedo
 Anthony Ortega
 Joe Ortiz
 Alfredo Pedrique
 Salvador Pérez
 Gustavo Polidor
 Max Ramírez
 Francisco Rodríguez
 Guillermo Rodríguez
 Argenis Salazar
 Luis Salazar 
 Oscar Salazar
 Richard Salazar
 Héctor Sánchez
 Luis Sánchez
 Danny Sandoval
 Jorge Velandia

All-time foreign players
 
 Michel Abreu
 Brant Alyea
 Larry Andersen
 Mike Armstrong
 Jeff Baisley
 Dusty Baker
 Jay Baller
 Skeeter Barnes
 John Bateman
 Marvin Benard
 Juan Berenguer
 Roger Bernadina
 Doug Bird 
 Bruce Bochy
 Walt Bond

 Daryl Boston
 Gene Brabender
 Bucky Brandon
 Tony Brizzolara
 George Brunet
 Bill Buckner
 Al Bumbry
 Bob Burda
 Sean Burroughs
 Bárbaro Cañizares
 José Cardenal
 Clay Carroll
 Paul Casanova
 Bryan Clark
 Gene Clines
 Lou Collier
 Pat Corrales
 Jerry Cram
 Tony Curry
 Chad Curtis
 Pat Dodson
 Mike Epstein
 Al Ferrara
 Rollie Fingers
 Ken Forsch
 Cito Gaston
 Jay Gibbons
 Troy Glaus
 Ed Glynn
 Brian Gordon
 Jerry Grote
 Larry Gura
 Ken Hamlin
 Brian Harper
 J. C. Hartman
 Mike Hedlund
 Gorman Heimueller
 Tom House
 Clint Hurdle
 James Hurst
 Ron Jackson
 Larry Jaster
 Johnny Jeter 
 Shawn Jeter
 Dave Johnson
 Andruw Jones
 Chris Jones
 Odell Jones
 Mike Kekich
 Pat Kelly
 Darold Knowles
 Gary Kroll
 Tom Lampkin
 Jason Lane
 Tim Leary
 Bob Lee
 Bill Lee 
 Marcelino López
 Andrew Lorraine
 Steve Luebber
 Barry Lyons
 Tom McCarthy
 José Macías
 Gordon Mackenzie
 Hal McRae
 Rick Mahler
 Jerry Manuel
 José Martínez
 Darrell Miller
 Aurelio Monteagudo
 Donnie Moore
 Omar Moreno
 Curt Motton
 Greg Norton
 Camilo Pascual
 Steve Pegues
 Adolfo Phillips
 Rich Nye 
 Jerry Nyman
 Jesse Orosco
 Lou Piniella
 Lou Pote
 Bill Pulsipher
 Gary Rajsich
 Fernando Ramsey
 Stephen Randolph
 Merritt Ranew
 Merv Rettenmund
 Dave Roberts
 Jim Rooker
 Johnny Ruffin
 Chico Ruiz
 Olmedo Sáenz
 Alex Sánchez
 Scott Service
 Randall Simon
 Doug Sisk
 Jim Siwy
 Darryl Strawberry
 Derrel Thomas
 Gary Thurman
 Luis Tiant
 Del Unser
 Dave Vineyard
 Johnny Weekly
 Ryan Vogelsong
 John Wathan
 Eddie Watt
 Jim Weaver
 Ray Webster
 Albert Williams
 Dale Willis
 Travis Wilson
 Mike Witt
 Jimmy Wynn
 Larry Yellen
 Gerald Young
 Walter Young

 Sources: PuraPelota.com

Retired numbers
   3 Luis Salazar
   8 Ángel Bravo
 11 Luis Aparicio
 13 Ozzie Guillén
 14 Gustavo Polidor
 15 Robert Marcano
 40 Carlos Martínez
 41 Aurelio Monteagudo

See also
Tiburones de La Guaira players
Venezuelan Professional Baseball League

References

External links
Official Site (Spanish)
Museum on Line (Spanish)

La Guaira
La Guaira
Baseball teams established in 1962
1962 establishments in Venezuela